On November 2, 2010, the District of Columbia held an election for its non-voting House delegate representing the District of Columbia's at-large congressional district. The winner of the race is to serve in the 112th Congress from January 3, 2011, until January 3, 2013.

The delegate is elected for two-year terms.

Match-up summary

Candidates
Eleanor Holmes Norton, a Democrat, has held the seat since 1991 and was up for reelection in 2010. Her Democratic opponent in the primary election was Douglass Sloan, who is only the second candidate to ever challenge Holmes Norton in a primary since she took office in 1991.

Missy Reilly Smith, an anti-abortion activist, was the Republican candidate.  She ran unopposed in the primary election. Smith caused a controversy by running television ads featuring graphic images of aborted fetuses. Smith herself had undergone two abortions in the past.

Primary
The primary election took place on for September 14 for both the offices of Delegate and Shadow Representative. Incumbent Eleanor Norton Holmes faced only the second primary challenge since she took office in 1991.

General election

See also
 United States House of Representatives elections in the District of Columbia

References

2010 elections in Washington, D.C.
District of Columbia
2010